The 2019 China Open (officially known as the Victor China Open 2019  for sponsorship reasons) was a badminton tournament which took place at Olympic Sports Center Xincheng Gymnasium in Changzhou, Jiangsu, China, from 17 to 22 September 2019 and had a total prize of $1,000,000.

Tournament
The 2019 China Open was the eighteenth tournament of the 2019 BWF World Tour and also part of the China Open championships, which have been held since 1986. This tournament was organized by Chinese Badminton Association and sanctioned by the BWF.

Venue
This international tournament was held at Olympic Sports Center Xincheng Gymnasium in Changzhou, Jiangsu, China.

Point distribution
Below is the point distribution table for each phase of the tournament based on the BWF points system for the BWF World Tour Super 1000 event.

Prize money
The total prize money for this tournament was US$1,000,000. Distribution of prize money was in accordance with BWF regulations.

Men's singles

Seeds

 Kento Momota (champion)
 Chou Tien-chen (quarter-finals)
 Shi Yuqi (first round)
 Jonatan Christie (first round)
 Chen Long (semi-finals)
 Viktor Axelsen (first round)
 Anthony Sinisuka Ginting (final)
 Anders Antonsen (semi-finals)

Finals

Top half

Section 1

Section 2

Bottom half

Section 3

Section 4

Women's singles

Seeds

 Akane Yamaguchi (first round)
 Tai Tzu-ying (final)
 Chen Yufei (semi-finals)
 Nozomi Okuhara (first round)
 P. V. Sindhu (second round) 
 Ratchanok Intanon (quarter-finals)
 He Bingjiao (quarter-finals)
 Saina Nehwal (first round)

Finals

Top half

Section 1

Section 2

Bottom half

Section 3

Section 4

Men's doubles

Seeds

 Marcus Fernaldi Gideon / Kevin Sanjaya Sukamuljo (champions)
 Mohammad Ahsan / Hendra Setiawan (final)
 Li Junhui / Liu Yuchen (semi-finals)
 Takeshi Kamura / Keigo Sonoda (quarter-finals)
 Hiroyuki Endo / Yuta Watanabe (quarter-finals)
 Han Chengkai / Zhou Haodong (first round)
 Fajar Alfian / Muhammad Rian Ardianto (semi-finals)
 Kim Astrup / Anders Skaarup Rasmussen (second round)

Finals

Top half

Section 1

Section 2

Bottom half

Section 3

Section 4

Women's doubles

Seeds

 Mayu Matsumoto / Wakana Nagahara (second round)
 Misaki Matsutomo / Ayaka Takahashi (final)
 Yuki Fukushima / Sayaka Hirota (semi-finals)
 Chen Qingchen / Jia Yifan (champions)
 Greysia Polii / Apriyani Rahayu (quarter-finals)
 Lee So-hee / Shin Seung-chan (quarter-finals)
 Du Yue / Li Yinhui (quarter-finals)
 Shiho Tanaka / Koharu Yonemoto (withdrew)

Finals

Top half

Section 1

Section 2

Bottom half

Section 3

Section 4

Mixed doubles

Seeds

 Zheng Siwei / Huang Yaqiong (champions)
 Wang Yilyu / Huang Dongping (final)
 Yuta Watanabe / Arisa Higashino (quarter-finals)
 Dechapol Puavaranukroh / Sapsiree Taerattanachai (semi-finals)
 Chan Peng Soon / Goh Liu Ying (second round)
 Praveen Jordan / Melati Daeva Oktavianti (first round)
 Seo Seung-jae / Chae Yoo-jung (semi-finals)
 Marcus Ellis / Lauren Smith (second round)

Finals

Top half

Section 1

Section 2

Bottom half

Section 3

Section 4

References

External links
 Tournament Link

China Open (badminton)
China Open (badminton)
China Open (badminton)
China Open (badminton)